26 Men is a syndicated American Western television series about the Arizona Rangers, a law-enforcement group limited to 26 active members. By March 1958, the program was carried on 158 stations in the United States. The program was also broadcast on ATN-7 in Australia and on ZBM-TV in Bermuda.

Synopsis and background 
The series is set in the Arizona Territory in the first decade of the 20th century. The rangers were part of the group established by the Arizona Territorial Legislature in 1901. The number of members was limited to 26 "to avoid vigilantism". Information from government archives and newspapers provided the basis of the plots of episodes.

Cast

Main 

 Tris Coffin as Captain Thomas H. Rynning 
 Kelo Henderson as ranger Clint Travis.

Guest stars

Episodes

Series overview

Season 1 (1957–58)

Season 2 (1958–59)

Production
Russell Hayden was the producer of the ABC Film Syndication series. Reg Browne was the director, Sloane Nibley was the writer, and Oliver Drake was the adapter. The theme song was written by Hal Hopper.

Facilities of Cudia City Studios, in Phoenix, Arizona, were expanded to handle filming of 26 Men. When the series filmed on location, local residents often filled some roles in the cast. It was "reportedly the first TV series ever to be filmed completely in Arizona."

Sponsors 
As a syndicated program, 26 Men had different sponsors in different parts of the United States. They included H. P. Hood and Sons (a dairy) for all of New England; Mrs. Smith's Pie Company and Freihofer Baking Company (alternating weekly) in four cities in Pennsylvania; Atlantic & Pacific Tea Company in Pittsburgh, Syracuse, and Buffalo; and Standard Oil of Texas in eight markets in Texas and New Mexico.

Release

Home media 
Timeless Media Group released a 3-disc best-of set, featuring 20 episodes from the series on DVD in Region 1 on April 12, 2011.

References

External links 
 

1957 American television series debuts
1959 American television series endings
Television series set in the 1900s
Black-and-white American television shows
English-language television shows
First-run syndicated television programs in the United States
Television shows set in Arizona
Television shows filmed in Arizona
Television series by CBS Studios
1950s Western (genre) television series